Amenmose, Son of Pendjerty (sometimes named Amenmessu) was a royal scribe from the time of Ramesses II. Amenmose was the son of the judge Pendjerty and the sistrum bearer of Amun, Mut and Khonsu, named Mutemonet.

Life and career
A statue now in the British museum indicates that Amenmose's father Pendjerty was from Iwny (modern Esna). 
  p:n-M36:t*Z4-O49 - Pendjerty in hieroglyphics 
His mother's name is given as Mutemonet, and her name is shortened to Inty and Iny on different monuments. 
  i-A2-n-i-i  - Iny as written on the Manchester Museum statue
  i-A2-S3:Z1*Z1-i-i  - Name recorded in TT 373
Several of the monuments Amenmose left behind show the goddess Neith in a place of prominence, which may be a reference to the birthplace of his father. Neith was worshipped in Esna. In his tomb in Thebes Amenmose is said to be not only a scribe, but also the Head of the Temples. This may indicate that he inspected temples. Hibachi mentions that this may explain why his monuments were found in so many different locations.

Monuments
Amenmose is known from several monuments:
 Theban tomb TT373. The tomb was discovered in 1948 when local inhabitants of Khohka found the tomb underneath one of their houses.
 A block statue now in Cairo (CGC 42,169)
 A statue fragment from Qantir. 
 A statue in the British Museum  (BM 137). Amenmose is said to be the son of Pendjerty and Inty.
 A statue from Tolemaita, Libya. Amenemone is said to be the son of the dignitary Pendjerty and of the sistrum-player Mutemonet. 
 A squatting statue from Memphis. The statue is broken in two and part is located in the Vienna Kunsthistorisches Museum (Inv 5749) and part is now in the Manchester University Museum.

See also
 List of ancient Egyptian scribes

References

People of the Nineteenth Dynasty of Egypt
Ramesses II
Ancient Egyptian scribes